Leo Faaeteete (born 10 May 1987) is a Samoa rugby union footballer. A fullback, he is currently playing for Steaua București Rugby in the Romanian Rugby Championship.

External links
Profile at Ercrugby.com

1987 births
Living people
Samoan rugby union players
Rugby union fullbacks
Samoan expatriate rugby union players
Expatriate rugby union players in Romania
Samoan expatriate sportspeople in Romania